George John Edmond de Beauvoir Terrell (June 1862 – 7 November 1952) was a Conservative Party politician in the United Kingdom.

He was elected as Member of Parliament (MP) for Chippenham at the January 1910 general election, defeating the Liberal incumbent John Poynder Dickson. At the December 1918 general election he was challenged by Liberal candidate Albert Bennett and Labour party candidate Reuben George, but beat both of them to retain his seat as MP. He held the Chippenham seat until his defeat at the 1922 general election by the Liberal candidate Alfred Bonwick.

He was the father of Sir Reginald Terrell; unusually, father and son sat in Parliament at the same time, with Reginald representing Henley from 1918 until 1924.

References

External links 
 

1862 births
1952 deaths
Conservative Party (UK) MPs for English constituencies
UK MPs 1910
UK MPs 1910–1918
UK MPs 1918–1922